XI: The Days Before Tomorrow is an album by the hard rock band Lillian Axe, released in 2012 it is the first album to feature lead vocalist Brian Jones. A free concert and album release party was hosted on February 4, 2012 at the Howlin' Wolf, a popular music venue in New Orleans.
A departure from earlier albums, the album features piano and features numerous acoustic guitar parts

Track listing
All songs by Steve Blaze, except "The Great Divide" by Blaze and Rob Hovey
 "Babylon" – 5:41
 "Death Comes Tomorrow" – 5:50
 "Gather Up the Snow" – 4:55
 "The Great Divide" – 6:26
 "Take the Bullet" – 3:23
 "Bow Your Head" – 5:03
 "Caged In" – 4:41
 "Soul Disease" – 4:15
 "Lava on My Tongue" – 5:33
 "My Apologies" – 4:46
 "Angels Among Us" (European bonus track) – 4:06
 "You Belong to Me" (hidden bonus track) – 4:59

Personnel
 Brian C. Jones – lead vocals
 Steve Blaze – lead guitar, backing vocals, keyboards
 Sam Poitevent – rhythm guitar, backing vocals, keyboards
 Eric Morris – bass guitar
 Rob Hovey - Drums #1,4,6,10
 Ken Koudelka – drums

References

2012 albums
Lillian Axe albums
AFM Records albums